Sheryl Nelson Cole (born August 16, 1964) is a Texas Democratic member of the Texas House of Representatives for House District 46, which is located in Travis County, Texas.

Education 
Cole earned her Bachelor of Arts in accounting from University of Texas in Austin and her Juris Doctor from the University of Texas School of Law.

Texas House of Representatives 
On May 22, 2018, Cole won the democratic primary runoff election for Texas House District 46 with 51% of the vote to her opponent's 49%. On November 6, 2018, she won the general election with 82% of the vote to her opponent's 18%.

References

Living people
Place of birth missing (living people)
21st-century American politicians
21st-century American women politicians
Democratic Party members of the Texas House of Representatives
Women state legislators in Texas
University of Texas alumni
University of Texas School of Law alumni
1964 births